Wandering Spirit may refer to:

Wandering Spirit (album), an album by Mick Jagger
 Wandering Spirit (Mick Jagger song)
Wandering Spirit (Cree leader), a Cree war chief